Francisco "Paco" Marhuenda García (born 1961) is a Spanish journalist, professor and former politician.

Member of the People's Party Parliamentary Group in the Parliament of Catalonia between 1995 and 1996, he later worked in the staff of Mariano Rajoy during the later's spell as minister. Since 2008, Marhuenda is the editor of La Razón, a conservative daily newspaper.

Biography 
Marhuenda was born on 12 January 1961 in Barcelona.
He graduated in Journalism and later obtained a PhD in Law.

He worked for the Barcelonian edition of the ABC daily newspaper.

A former member of the national executive of the UCD Youth Wing, Marhuenda joined the People's Party (PP) in 1995, and became a member of the Parliament of Catalonia after the 1995 Catalan regional election. He resigned to his seat in 1996, to become chief of staff of the Minister of Public Administrations, chief of Staff of the Minister of Education and Culture in 1999, and director general of Relation with the Cortes in 2000, always under the aegis of Mariano Rajoy.

Following the ousting of José María Aznar from the government, Marhuenda returned to journalism. In 2008, Marhuenda, until then working as delegate of La Razón in Barcelona, was chosen by Mauricio Casals to become the new editor of the newspaper in Madrid. Soon after becoming editor Marhuenda described the leaning of the conservative and confessional newspaper as "unabashedly right-wing".

A member of the Catholic Association of Propagandists, Marhuenda obtained a second PhD in 2015 reading a thesis dealing with press freedom in Spain at the CEU San Pablo University.

In April 2017, Marhuenda and Casals were criminally indicted accused of participating in a extorsion scheme against the President of the Community of Madrid Cristina Cifuentes, which would have the purpose of hindering the investigations on the corruption case around the Canal de Isabel II water company. Soon after charges against Marhuenda and Casals were dropped.

Works

References 

living people
1961 births
Spanish journalists
Members of the 5th Parliament of Catalonia
Conservatism in Spain
ABC (newspaper) people